Posthotel Rössli is a 3-star-hotel in the middle of Gstaad, Switzerland. It is the oldest hotel in the town.

History 
The hotel, built c. 1823 and bought in 1844 by Bendicht Steffen, first opened in 1845 as a guesthouse; it also served as a post office. Since 1922, the Widmer family has owned the hotel, which is now operated by brothers Conroy and Lars Widmer.

External links 
 Website des Hotels

Commercial buildings completed in 1823
Hotels in Switzerland
19th-century architecture in Switzerland